Rugby 2004 is the 2003 installment of Electronic Arts' Rugby video game series. The game was developed by HB Studios, published by EA Sports, and released in 2003. The game is a follow-up to 2000's Rugby 2001, and is succeeded by Rugby 2005, Rugby 06 and Rugby 08. Rugby 2004 features over 60 teams, over 1500 players and over 65 stadiums. The game's commentators are BBC's John Inverdale, and Channel 7's Gordon Bray. The game's soundtrack is provided by INXS. It supports up to 4 players playing on the PlayStation 2 via Multitap, and also utilises the console's online multiplayer function. The cover athlete is Wallabies' scrum-half George Gregan.

Reception

The game received "mixed" reviews on both platforms according to the review aggregation website Metacritic.

References

External links

2003 video games
EA Sports games
HB Studios games
Multiplayer and single-player video games
PlayStation 2 games
Rugby union video games
Video games developed in Canada
Video games set in Australia
Video games set in France
Video games set in Ireland
Video games set in New Zealand
Video games set in South Africa
Video games set in the United Kingdom
Windows games